Central Fund or central fund may refer to:
 In government fund accounting, the main fund for tax and spending
 Central Fund (Ireland)
 Consolidated Fund, name in the UK and India 
 A central bank fund
 Central Fund (Bangladesh), a  Ministry of Labour and Employment fund providing financial support to workers
 Central Fund of Israel, American non-profit association which funding Israeli settlement projects in the West Bank

See also
 Fund (disambiguation)